Haiyan County is a county under the administration of Jiaxing City, in the north of Zhejiang province, China, situated on the north shore of Hangzhou Bay and includes the north end of the Hangzhou Bay Bridge.

Population is 370,000. Postal code: 314300.

The county government is located on 118 Zaoyuan Middle Rd, Wuyuan town.

In August 2010, Haiyan was selected to house the 'Nuclear City'. China will reportedly spend some €130 billion over the next ten years on developing the 130 square-kilometer Haiyan Nuclear City, which will be needed by local industry. By 2014, nine nuclear power plants should be in operation, with electrical generating capacity of around 6300 MWe, which will help reduce the country's carbon footprint.

In September 2015, Six Flags and Riverside Group announced that they would build the first international Six Flags theme park in Haiyan County, Zhejiang.

Administrative divisions
Subdistricts:
Wuyuan Subdistrict (武原街道), Qinshan Subdistrict (秦山街道), Xitangqiao Subdistrict (西塘桥街道), Yuantong Subdistrict (元通街道)

Towns:
Shendang (沈荡镇), Tongyuan (通元镇), Chepu (澉浦镇), Yucheng (于城镇), Baibu (百步镇)

Climate

References

External links
Official website of Haiyan County Government

County-level divisions of Zhejiang
Jiaxing